Ripple Creek Pass is a high mountain pass in The Flat Tops mountains of western Colorado. Rio Blanco County Road 8, a gravel road, traverses the pass, which divides the watersheds of Poose Creek to the north and Snell Creek to the south. The border between Routt and White River national forests also crosses the pass.

The pass, part of the Flat Tops Trail Scenic and Historic Byway, is accessible to passenger cars, but only seasonally, generally from late May to October. The Ripple Creek Overlook, south of the actual pass, provides views of The Flat Tops and the Flat Tops Wilderness Area.

References

Mountain passes of Colorado
Landforms of Rio Blanco County, Colorado